Max Willian Carrasco (born May 3, 1984) is a Brazilian football player.

Career
Born in Belo Horizonte, Carrasco has played in the Campeonato Brasileiro Série B with Betim Esporte Clube (formerly known as Ipatinga Futebol Clube) on multiple occasions.

Club statistics
Statistics accurate as of 5 February 2012

1
2

References

External links

1984 births
Living people
Brazilian footballers
Brazilian expatriate footballers
Expatriate footballers in Japan
Marília Atlético Clube players
Grêmio Barueri Futebol players
Esporte Clube Noroeste players
Ipatinga Futebol Clube players
Villa Nova Atlético Clube players
Luverdense Esporte Clube players
Anápolis Futebol Clube players
Vegalta Sendai players
J1 League players
Association football midfielders
Footballers from Belo Horizonte